Neonatal jaundice is a yellowish discoloration of the white part of the eyes and skin in a newborn baby due to high bilirubin levels. Other symptoms may include excess sleepiness or poor feeding. Complications may include seizures, cerebral palsy, or kernicterus.

In most of cases there is no specific underlying physiologic disorder. In other cases it results from red blood cell breakdown, liver disease, infection, hypothyroidism, or metabolic disorders (pathologic). A bilirubin level more than 34 μmol/L (2 mg/dL) may be visible. Concerns, in otherwise healthy babies, occur when levels are greater than 308 μmol/L (18 mg/dL), jaundice is noticed in the first day of life, there is a rapid rise in levels, jaundice lasts more than two weeks, or the baby appears unwell. In those with concerning findings further investigations to determine the underlying cause are recommended.

The need for treatment depends on bilirubin levels, the age of the child, and the underlying cause. Treatments may include more frequent feeding, phototherapy, or exchange transfusions. In those who are born early more aggressive treatment tends to be required. Physiologic jaundice generally lasts less than seven days. The condition affects over half of babies in the first week of life. Of babies that are born early about 80% are affected. Globally over 100,000 late-preterm and term babies die each year as a result of jaundice.

Sign and symptoms
Bronze baby syndrome (dark pigmentation of skin).

The primary symptom is yellowish discoloration of the white part of the eyes and skin in a newborn baby. Other symptoms may include excess sleepiness or poor feeding.

A bilirubin level more than 34 μmol/L (2 mg/dL) may be visible. For the feet to be affected level generally must be over 255 μmol/L (15 mg/dL).

Complications
Prolonged hyperbilirubinemia (severe jaundice) can result in chronic bilirubin encephalopathy (kernicterus).  Quick and accurate treatment of neonatal jaundice helps to reduce the risk of neonates developing kernicterus.

Infants with kernicterus may have a fever or seizures. High pitched crying is an effect of kernicterus.

Exchange transfusions performed to lower high bilirubin levels are an aggressive treatment.

Causes
In newborns, jaundice tends to develop because of two factors—the breakdown of fetal hemoglobin as it is replaced with adult hemoglobin and the relatively immature metabolic pathways of the liver, which are unable to conjugate and so excrete bilirubin as quickly as an adult. This causes an accumulation of bilirubin in the blood (hyperbilirubinemia), leading to the symptoms of jaundice.

If the neonatal jaundice is not resolved with simple phototherapy, other causes such as biliary atresia, Progressive familial intrahepatic cholestasis, bile duct paucity, Alagille syndrome, alpha 1-antitrypsin deficiency, and other pediatric liver diseases should be considered. The evaluation for these will include blood work and a variety of diagnostic tests.  Prolonged neonatal jaundice is serious and should be followed up promptly.

Severe neonatal jaundice may indicate the presence of other conditions contributing to the elevated bilirubin levels, of which there are a large variety of possibilities (see below).  These should be detected or excluded as part of the differential diagnosis to prevent the development of complications.  They can be grouped into the following categories:

Unconjugated

Hemolytic

Intrinsic causes of hemolysis
 Membrane conditions
 Spherocytosis
 Hereditary elliptocytosis
 Enzyme conditions
 Glucose-6-phosphate dehydrogenase deficiency (also called G6PD deficiency)
 Pyruvate kinase deficiency
 Globin synthesis defect
 sickle cell disease
 Alpha-thalassemia, e.g. HbH disease

Extrinsic causes of hemolysis
 Systemic conditions
 Sepsis
 Arteriovenous malformation
 Alloimmunity (The neonatal or cord blood gives a positive direct Coombs test and the maternal blood gives a positive indirect Coombs test)
 Hemolytic disease of the newborn (ABO)
 Rh disease
 Hemolytic disease of the newborn (anti-Kell)
 Hemolytic disease of the newborn (anti-Rhc)
 Other blood type mismatches causing hemolytic disease of the newborn

Non-hemolytic causes
 Breastfeeding jaundice
 Breast milk jaundice
 Cephalohematoma
 Polycythemia
 Urinary tract infection
 Sepsis
 Hypothyroidism
 Gilbert's syndrome
 Crigler–Najjar syndrome
 High GI obstruction (Pyloric stenosis, Bowel obstruction)

Conjugated (Direct)

Liver causes
 Infections
 Sepsis
 Hepatitis A
 Hepatitis B
 TORCH infections
 Metabolic
 Galactosemia
 Alpha 1-antitrypsin deficiency, which is commonly missed, and must be considered in DDx
 Cystic fibrosis
 Dubin–Johnson syndrome
 Rotor syndrome
 Drugs
 Total parenteral nutrition
 Idiopathic

Post-liver
 Biliary atresia or bile duct obstruction
 Alagille syndrome
 Choledochal cyst

Non-organic causes

Breastfeeding jaundice
"Breastfeeding jaundice" (or "lack of breastfeeding jaundice") is caused by insufficient breast milk intake, resulting in inadequate quantities of bowel movements to remove bilirubin from the body. This leads to increased enterohepatic circulation, resulting in increased reabsorption of bilirubin from the intestines. Usually occurring in the first week of life, most cases can be ameliorated by frequent breastfeeding sessions of sufficient duration to stimulate adequate milk production.

Breast milk jaundice
Whereas breastfeeding jaundice is a mechanical problem, breast milk jaundice is a biochemical occurrence and the higher bilirubin possibly acts as an antioxidant. Breast milk jaundice occurs later in the newborn period, with the bilirubin level usually peaking in the sixth to 14th days of life. This late-onset jaundice may develop in up to one third of healthy breastfed infants.
 The gut is sterile at birth and normal gut flora takes time to establish. The bacteria in the adult gut convert conjugated bilirubin to stercobilinogen which is then oxidized to stercobilin and excreted in the stool. In the absence of sufficient bacteria, the bilirubin is de-conjugated by brush border β-glucuronidase and reabsorbed. This process of re-absorption is called enterohepatic circulation. It has been suggested that bilirubin uptake in the gut (enterohepatic circulation) is increased in breast fed babies, possibly as the result of increased levels of epidermal growth factor (EGF) in breast milk. Breast milk also contains glucoronidase which will increase deconjugation and enterohepatic recirculation of bilirubin.
 The breast-milk of some women contains a metabolite of progesterone called 3-alpha-20-beta pregnanediol. This substance inhibits the action of the enzyme uridine diphosphoglucuronic acid (UDPGA) glucuronyl transferase responsible for conjugation and subsequent excretion of bilirubin. In the newborn liver, activity of glucuronyl transferase is only at 0.1-1% of adult levels, so conjugation of bilirubin is already reduced. Further inhibition of bilirubin conjugation leads to increased levels of bilirubin in the blood. However, these results have not been supported by subsequent studies.
 An enzyme in breast milk called lipoprotein lipase produces increased concentration of nonesterified free fatty acids that inhibit hepatic glucuronyl transferase, which again leads to decreased conjugation and subsequent excretion of bilirubin.

Physiological jaundice
Most infants develop visible jaundice due to elevation of unconjugated bilirubin concentration during their first week. This is called physiological jaundice. This pattern of hyperbilirubinemia has been classified into two functionally distinct periods.
 Phase one
 Term infants - jaundice lasts for about 10 days with a rapid rise of serum bilirubin up to 204 μmol/L (12 mg/dL).
 Preterm infants - jaundice lasts for about two weeks, with a rapid rise of serum bilirubin up to 255 μmol/L (15 mg/dL).
 Phase two - bilirubin levels decline to about 34 μmol/L (2 mg/dL) for two weeks, eventually mimicking adult values.
 Preterm infants - phase two can last more than one month.
 Exclusively breastfed infants - phase two can last more than one month.

Mechanisms involved in physiological jaundice include:
 Relatively low activity of the enzyme glucuronosyltransferase which normally converts unconjugated bilirubin to conjugated bilirubin that can be excreted into the gastrointestinal tract. Before birth, this enzyme is actively down-regulated, since bilirubin needs to remain unconjugated in order to cross the placenta to avoid being accumulated in the fetus. After birth, it takes some time for this enzyme to gain function.
 Shorter life span of fetal red blood cells, being approximately 80 to 90 days in a full term infant, compared to 100 to 120 days in adults.
 Relatively low conversion of bilirubin to urobilinogen by the intestinal flora, resulting in relatively high absorption of bilirubin back into the circulation.

Diagnosis
Diagnosis is often by measuring the serum bilirubin level in the blood. In those who are born after 35 weeks and are more than a day old transcutaneous bilirubinometer may also be used. The use of an icterometer, a piece of transparent plastic painted in five transverse strips of graded yellow lines, is not recommended.

Transcutaneous bilirubinometer
This is hand held, portable and rechargeable but expensive. When pressure is applied to the photoprobe, a xenon tube generates a strobe light, and this light passes through the subcutaneous tissue. The reflected light returns through the second fiber optic bundle to the spectrophotometric module. The intensity of the yellow color in this light, after correcting for the hemoglobin, is measured and instantly displayed in arbitrary units.

Pathological jaundice
Any of the following features suggests pathological jaundice:
 Clinical jaundice appearing in the first 24 hours or greater than 14 days of life.
 Increases in the level of total bilirubin by more than 8.5 μmol/L (0.5 mg/dL) per hour or (85 μmol/L) 5 mg/dL per 24 hours.
 Total bilirubin more than 331.5 μmol/L (19.5 mg/dL) (hyperbilirubinemia).
 Direct bilirubin more than 34 μmol/L (2.0 mg/dL).

The signs which help detect pathological jaundice are the presence of intrauterine growth restriction, stigma of intrauterine infections (e.g. cataracts, small head, and enlargement of the liver and spleen), cephalohematoma, bruising, signs of bleeding in the brain's ventricles. History of illness is noteworthy. Family history of jaundice and anemia, family history of neonatal or early infant death due to liver disease, maternal illness suggestive of viral infection (fever, rash or lymphadenopathy), maternal drugs (e.g. sulphonamides, anti-malarials causing red blood cell destruction in G6PD deficiency) are suggestive of pathological jaundice in neonates.

Treatment
The bilirubin levels for initiative of phototherapy varies depends on the age and health status of the newborn.  However, any newborn with a total serum bilirubin greater than 359 μmol/L ( 21 mg/dL) should receive phototherapy.

Phototherapy

Babies with neonatal jaundice may be treated with colored light called phototherapy, which works by changing trans-bilirubin into the water-soluble cis-bilirubin isomer.

The phototherapy involved is not ultraviolet light therapy but rather a specific frequency of blue light. The light can be applied with overhead lamps, which means that the baby's eyes need to be covered, or with a device called a biliblanket, which sits under the baby's clothing close to its skin.

The use of phototherapy was first discovered, accidentally, at Rochford Hospital in Essex, England, when a nurse, Sister Jean Ward, noticed that babies exposed to sunlight had reduced jaundice, and a pathologist, Dr. Perryman, who noticed that a vial of blood left in the sun had turned green. Drs Cremer, Richards and Dobbs put together these observations, leading to a landmark randomized clinical trial which was published in Pediatrics in 1968; it took another ten years for the practice to become established.
Massage therapy could be useful in addition to phototherapy in order to reduce the phototherapy duration. However, it does not appear to reduce the requirement for phototherapy in the treatment of neonatal jaundice.

Recent studies from several countries show that phototherapy can safely and effectively be performed in the family's home, and since 2022 home phototherapy is recommended as an alternative to readmission to hospital in the American national guidelines.
However, there have been several reports about the possible relationship between neonatal phototherapy and the increased risk of future cancer. A recent systematic review has found that there may be a statistically significant association between phototherapy and various hematopoietic cancers (especially myeloid leukemia).

Exchange transfusions
Much like with phototherapy the level at which exchange transfusion should occur depends on the health status and age of the newborn.  It should however be used for any newborn with a total serum bilirubin of greater than 428 μmol/L ( 25 mg/dL ).

Research
Penicillamine was studied in the 1970s in hyperbilirubinemia due to ABO hemolytic disease. While tin mesoporphyrin IX may decrease bilirubin such use is not recommended in babies. Preclinical studies have looked at minocycline to help prevent neurotoxicity. Clofibrate may decrease the duration of phototherapy. Evidence as of 2012 however is insufficient to recommend its use.

References

External links 
 American Academy of Pediatrics has issued guidelines for managing this disease, which can be obtained for free.
 National Institute for Health and Care Excellence (NICE) has issued guidelines for the recognition and treatment of neonatal jaundice in the United Kingdom.

Neonatology
Hepatology
Haemorrhagic and haematological disorders of fetus and newborn
Wikipedia medicine articles ready to translate